An adult is an age or other organism that has reached the mature developmental stage.

Adult may also refer to:

 Sexual maturity
 Age of majority
 Adult (band), an American rock band
 Adult (album), a 2006 album by Tokyo Jihen
 Adult (magazine), a magazine of erotic art and literature

See also 
 Adulthood (disambiguation)
 Mature (disambiguation)
 Maturation (disambiguation)
 Maturity (disambiguation)